SV Würmla are an Austrian association football club founded in 1969 and playing in the 5th tier Lower Austria 2. Landesliga West during 2020/2021 season.

The club's biggest success to date was reaching the 2nd round of the 1998–99 Austrian Cup, losing 3-2 after extra time to FC Waidhofen/Ybbs.

Honours
Austrian Cup: 2nd round 1998-99
Landesliga Niederösterreich: Champions 2003-04

Current squad

Staff
 Trainer:  Maumer Dedic
 Co-Trainer:  Perry Krakowitsch
 Goalkeeper coach:  Wolfagang Bauer
 Physio:  Cladio Haaser

References

External links
  http://www.sv-wuermla.at  Official Website

Association football clubs established in 1969
Wurmla,SV
1969 establishments in Austria